Askar is a village on the southeastern coast of Bahrain, it is now part of Madinat Khalifa. It is also home to the shrine of Sa'sa'a bin Sohan, a companion of Imam Ali.  Inhabitants today include the Al-Buainain, Al-Kaabi, Al-Mansoori, Al-Ghadeer and Al-Azmi tribes. Many of the inhabitants have been living in the village for more than 3/4 generations. The population in the area grew almost double due to the Ministry of Housing's housing project.

References
 Al Wasat Newspaper

Populated places in Bahrain